Stahel is a surname. Notable people with the surname include:

 David Stahel (born 1975), military historian
 Florian Stahel (born 1985), footballer
 Julius Stahel (1825–1912), soldier
 Reiner Stahel (1892–1955), military officer
 Rolf Stahel (born 1944), Swiss businessman
 Walter R. Stahel (born 1946), Swiss architect